The Sacred Heart Catholic Church in Alturas, California is a historic church at 507 E. 4th Street.  It was listed on the National Register of Historic Places in 1983.

It was begun in 1883 but not completed until 1910. An addition was done in 1928.

A rectory was built in 1929.

See also
National Register of Historic Places listings in Modoc County, California

References

External links

Roman Catholic churches in California
Alturas, California
Buildings and structures in Modoc County, California
Roman Catholic churches completed in 1883
Churches on the National Register of Historic Places in California
Roman Catholic Diocese of Sacramento
Gothic Revival church buildings in California
National Register of Historic Places in Modoc County, California
19th-century Roman Catholic church buildings in the United States